Balnafoich ( meaning Township of the Green Field) was once only a small croft, but is now a  little settlement lying 7 miles south of Inverness, in Inverness-shire, Scottish Highlands and is in the Scottish council area of Highland.

Balnafoich lies on the River Nairn.

References

Populated places in Inverness committee area